is a Japanese professional baseball pitcher for the Hanshin Tigers of Nippon Professional Baseball (NPB). He previously played in NPB for the Fukuoka SoftBank Hawks.

Professional career

Fukuoka SoftBank Hawks

On October 30, 2008, Niho was drafted as a developmental player by the Fukuoka SoftBank Hawks in the 2008 Nippon Professional Baseball draft.

2009–2015
From 2009 to mid-2012, Niho played in informal matches against the Shikoku Island League Plus's teams and amateur baseball teams, and played in the Western League of NPB's second league. In November 2011, he became a free agent at the expiration of his contract according to the regulations of the developmental player system, but was re-signed.

On July 30, 2012, he signed a 5 million yen re-contract with the Fukuoka SoftBank Hawks as a registered player under control. On September 13, Niho pitched his debut game against the Tohoku Rakuten Golden Eagles.

In 2013, Niho recorded a 6.00 ERA in 5 games with Fukuoka, spending the majority of the year at the farm. He spent the entirety of the 2014 season at the farm, posting a 2.91 ERA in 33 games.

On May 3, 2015, Niho recorded his first of the 2015 season. In 2015, he finished the regular season with a 6-1 record and 3.25 ERA to go along with 5 holds and 28 strikeouts in 52 2/3 innings across 44 appearances. Additionally, Niho won the 2015 Japan Series with Fukuoka.

2016–2020
On April 19, 2016, Niho underwent Tommy John surgery and missed the remainder of the year. Niho appeared in 16 games with the farm team in 2017, without playing for Fukuoka.

On April 10, 2018, Niho pitched in the Pacific League against the Hokkaido Nippon-Ham Fighters for the first time in three years. For the 2018 season, he finished the regular season with a 1-0 record and 5.34 ERA with 4 holds, 1 save, and 17 strikeouts in 30 1/3 innings of work across 35 appearances. Niho won the 2018 Japan Series with Fukuoka.

In 2019, Niho finished the regular season with a 1-4 record and 3.99 ERA with 15 strikeouts in 38 1/3 innings across 8 games. He won the 2019 Japan Series, his third championship victory of his career.

In a match against the Tohoku Rakuten Golden Eagles on July 11, 2020, Niho pitched his longest outing of his career, going 7 innings to become the winning pitcher. In 2020, he finished the regular season with a 4-5 record and 4.92 ERA with 28 strikeouts in 56 2/3 innings of work across 12 games. He won the 2020 Japan Series against the Yomiuri Giants, his fourth Japan Series win of his career. Niho made only 2 appearances for Fukuoka in 2021, posting a 4.76 ERA in 11.1 innings pitched.

Hanshin Tigers
On July 2, 2021, Niho was traded to the Hanshin Tigers in exchange for Masahiro Nakatani.

References

External links

 Career statistics -  NPB.ip
選手プロフィール 2021年 34 二保旭 - Hanshin Tigers Official site 

1990 births
Living people
People from Yukuhashi, Fukuoka
Baseball people from Fukuoka Prefecture
Japanese expatriate baseball players in Puerto Rico
Nippon Professional Baseball pitchers
Fukuoka SoftBank Hawks players
Hanshin Tigers players
Atenienses de Manatí (baseball) players